Queenie Tai is a Taiwanese actress.

Filmography

Film

Television series

Personal life
On 30 June 2012, Tai married .

References

External links
 
 

1982 births
21st-century Taiwanese actresses
Actresses from Taipei
Living people
Aletheia University alumni